, full title Aldynes: The Misson Code for Rage Crisis, is a horizontally scrolling shooter developed by Produce and released on February 22, 1991, for the SuperGrafx only for Japan. The game was made available on the PlayStation Network on February 16, 2011.

Plot
In the year 2020, Earth suffers from a devastating alien invasion. A large mechanical planetoid suddenly emerges from space and attacks the cities of Earth without reason or communication. With all defenses annihilated, the United Nations corresponds with NASA to make a powerful space fighter known as the SWA-402 Ortega, but the fighter fails to end the war. One of the Ortega pilots, known only by his call sign Fox-A, is killed in action. His bereaved girlfriend Hiroko soon discovers his involvement in the Pandora Project which houses the Ortega's successor: the SDE-201 Aldynes. As the invaders attack the air force housing the nearly complete Aldynes, Hiroko hijacks one of the ships and throws herself into battle in hopes of getting revenge.

Gameplay

Reception

References

External links
Hudson PlayStation Store Entry
Aldynes at MobyGames

1991 video games
Japan-exclusive video games
Science fiction video games
Horizontally scrolling shooters
SuperGrafx games
PlayStation Network games
Produce! games
Video games developed in Japan
Video games featuring female protagonists
Hudson Soft games
Video games set in 2020
Single-player video games
Alien invasions in video games
NASA in fiction